The Lost Album is the twelfth studio album by American rock band the Smithereens, released on September 23, 2022, by Sunset Blvd Records. It comprises tracks recorded in 1993 for an abandoned album, and is the first album of previously unreleased original material in eleven years, since the release of 2011 in 2011.

Background
In 1993, the Smithereens were in between the end of their contract with Capitol Records and the beginning of their deal with RCA. There had been a management change at Capitol Records and a number of artists, including the Smithereens, were let go in summer 1993. Since the release of their last album, 1991's Blow Up, the band had written a batch of songs they wanted to record. So, in early 1993, they entered a New York recording studio and recorded two albums worth of songs. "It was the first time we went in with the intention of producing a full album by ourselves ... we paid for everything," drummer Dennis Diken said in 2022. 

When the Smithereens eventually signed to RCA later in 1993, half of the songs were rerecorded for 1994's A Date with The Smithereens, and the remaining songs went into the band's archives. The twelve tracks on The Lost Album were rediscovered when the band went through their old piles of tapes and CDs for future archival releases. "We had all of the mixes on this material done back in 1993," Diken said. "So, all we really needed to do was to select the tracks, sequence them and master them." Bassist Mike Mesaros stated in the album liner notes that the album "remains only 80 percent finished and rough mixed." The original multitrack master tapes had been lost in a fire, which left the band with only copies of the rough mixes on digital audio tapes, "and they sounded fine," guitarist Jim Babjak  said.

Lead singer Pat DiNizio rerecorded the tracks "A World Apart" and "Everyday World" for his 1997 solo album Songs and Sounds.

Critical reception

The album received a positive reception from writers and critics. Many felt that it ranks among the band's best work. John Moore, writing for New Noise Magazine, described the album as "a dozen tight tracks of smart power pop with plenty of jangly guitars backing DiNizio's recognizably sunny vocals." He added, "You'd be hard pressed to distinguish songs like "Don’t Look Down" or "Love Runs Wild" from those off of Green Thoughts or 11." Andy Gray of the Tribune Chronicle found the album to be "full of catchy riffs and hooks that owe a debt to '60s influences like the Beatles without feeling stuck in the past," calling it a "great addition to the band's catalog."

Jason Green from The Arts STL website noted that the tracks didn't sound "labored over," writing, "Playing fast and loose just to get the songs down and letting things stay a little rough around the edges actually does the band favors." Rock and Roll Globe's Jim Allen wrote, "The Lost Album captures the Smithereens in transition but it feels like it fits right into their chronology."

On his website, writer Joel Gausten wrote that while the album has "plenty of treasures," it is also "a very mixed bag." He felt that the album needed an outside producer to add the necessary sheen, as some of the tracks merely "simmer when they deserve to scorch." He concluded that, ultimately, the album doesn't measure up to the rest of the Smithereens' discography. "If anything," he wrote, "it makes it clear that the strongest material the band created circa 1993 ended up on A Date with The Smithereens."

Track listing

Personnel
Adapted from the album liner notes.

The Smithereens
 Pat DiNizio – vocals, guitar
 Jim Babjak – guitar, percussion, backing vocals
 Mike Mesaros – bass, backing vocals
 Dennis Diken – drums, percussion, backing vocals
Additional musicians
 Uncredited – organ 
Technical
 The Smithereens – producer
 Larry Buxbaum – engineer
 Chuck Cavanaugh – engineer
 Sean Coffey – assistant engineer
 Armando Guerriero – studio assistance
 Mike Hamilton – studio assistance
 Kevin Weremeychik – studio assistance
 John Mehrmann – studio assistance
 Greg Calbi – mastering
 Bob Gramegna – photo restoration
 Dave Amels – technical assistance

References

The Smithereens albums
2022 albums
Unfinished albums